Hugh Acland may refer to:

Sir Hugh Acland, 5th Baronet (c. 1639–1714), English baron and member of Parliament
Sir Hugh Acland, 6th Baronet (1697–1728), English baron
Sir Hugh Acland (surgeon) (1874–1956), New Zealand surgeon
Sir Jack Acland (Hugh John Acland, 1904–1981), New Zealand politician

See also
Acland (surname)